The Text Book Centre Jomo Kenyatta Prize for Literature is a biennial literary award given by the Kenya Publishers' Association. It has been called "the most prestigious literary award in the country".

The first award ceremony took place in 1974, however due to financial constraints, it was unable to continue. In 1990, the award was revived with sponsorship from the Text Book Centre, and the first prize was given in 1992. Beginning in 2015, the award's official name was changed to Text Book Centre Jomo Kenyatta Prize for Literature.

Honorees

1974
 English winner: Meja Mwangi, Kill Me Quick
 Kiswahili winner: Abdilatif Abdalla, Sauti ya Dhiki

1992
 First prize: Wahome Mutahi, Three Days on the Cross
 First prize: David Maillu, The Broken Drum

1995
 First place: Margaret Ogola, The River and the Source
 Second place: Marjorie Oludhe Macgoye, Homing In
 Third place: Sam Kahiga, Paradise Farm

1997
 English winner: Ngumi Kibera, Grapevine Stories
 Kiswahili winner: Emmanuel Mbogo, Vipuli vya Figo
 Children's winner: Ezekiel Alembi, Settling the Score

1999
 (no awards)

2001
 English winner: Meja Mwangi, The Last Plague
 Kiswahili winner: Kyalo Wamitila, Nguvu ya Sala
 Children's winner: Lily Mabura, Ali the Little Sultan

2003
 English Adult Fiction first place: Stanley Gazemba, The Stone Hills of Maragoli
 English Adult Fiction second place: Tobias Otieno, The Missing Links
 English Adult Fiction third place: Paul Nakitare, I Shall Walk Alone
 English Children's first place: Wahome Mutahi, The Ghost of Garbatula
 Kiswahili first place: Ken Walibora, Ndoto ya Amerika

2005
 English Adult Fiction first place: (no prize)
 English Adult Fiction second place: Muroki Ndung’us, A Friend of the Court
 English Adult Fiction third place: Valerie Cuthbert, Wings of the Wind
 Kiswahili Adult first place: Kyalo Wamitila, Musaleo
 Kiswahili Adult second place: Ken Walibora, Kufa Kuzikana
 Kiswahili Adult third place: Kyalo Wamitila, Pango
 English Youth first place: Bill Ruto, Death Trap
 Kiswahili Children's first place: Ruth Wairimu Karani, Kofia ya kadogo

2007
 English Adult Fiction first place: Marjorie Oludhe Macgoye, A Farm Called Kishinev
 English Adult Fiction second place: Margaret Ogola Place of Destiny
 English Adult Fiction third place: Wanjiru Waithaka, The Unbroken Spirit
 Kiswahili Adult first place: Kyalo Wamitila, Msimu wa Vipepeo
 Kiswahili Adult second place: Joseph Muthee, Kizuizini
 Kiswahili Adult third place: Kimani Njogu Al Amin Mazrui, Sudana
 English Youth first place: Kingwa Kamencu, To Grasp at Star
 English Youth second place: Ken Walibora, Innocence Long Lost
 English Youth third place: Meja Mwangi, Boy Gift
 English Children's first place: Kabaru Ndegwa, The Wonderful Ball
 English Children's second place: Kyalo Wamitila, The Mysterious Box and the Magic Spoon
 English Children's third place: Nyambura Mpesha, Far Far Away
 Kiswahili Children's first place: Nyambura Mpesha, Hanna na Wanyama

2009
 English Adult Fiction first place: Henry Ole Kulet, Blossoms of the Savannah
 English Adult Fiction second place: Rhodia Mann, Hawecha: A Woman for All Time
 English Adult Fiction third place: Meja Mwangi, Big Chief
 Kiswahili Adult first place: Kyalo Wamitila, Unaitwa Nani
 Kiswahili Adult second place: Mwenda Mbatia, Vipanya Vya maabara
 Kiswahili Adult third place: Kala Tufaha, Omar Babu
 English Youth first place: Stephen Mugambi, Walk with me Angela
 English Youth second place: Juliet Barnes, Lake of Smoke
 Kiswahili Youth first place: Sheila Ali Ryango, dago wa munje
 Kiswahili Children's first place: Kisasi Hapana, Ken Walibora
 Kiswahili Children's second place: Bifungu Matundura, Sitaki iwe siri
 Kiswahili Children's third place: Atibu Bakari, Ngoma za Uchawi
 English Children's first place: Elizabeth Kabui, The Prize

2011
 English Adult Fiction first place: Yusuf Dawood, Eye of the Storm
 English Adult Fiction second place: Ng'ang'a Mbugua, Terrorists of the Aberdare
 English Adult Fiction third place: Joe Kiarie, The Lone Dancer
 Kiswahili Adult first place: Timothy M. Arege, Kijiba cha Moyo
 Kiswahili Adult second place: Alex Ngure, Utoro
 Kiswahili Adult third place: John Habwe, Fumbo la Maisha
 English Youth first place: Eva Kasaya, Tale of Kasaya
 English Youth second place: Muthoni wa Gichuru, Breaking the Silence
 English Youth third place: Leonard Kibera Njenga, The Reunion
 Kiswahili Youth first place: Godfrey Ipalei, Mlemavu? Si Mimi
 Kiswahili Youth second place: Pauline K. Kyovi, Kipendacho Roho
 Kiswahili Children's first place: Nuhu Z. Bakari, Wema wa Mwana
 Kiswahili Children's second place: Enan Mwakoti, Msichana Aliyeokoa Watu
 Kiswahili Children's third place: Florence Nyakeri, Sungura na Mbwa
 English Children's first place: Peter Kimani, Upside Down
 English Children's second place: Elizabeth O. Mazuri, Sheila, Let's Write to God
 English Children's third place: Christopher Okemwa, Let us Keep Tiger

2013
 English Adult: Henry Ole Kulet, Vanishing Herds
 Kiswahili Adult: Tom Olali, Watu wa Gehenna
 English Youth: David Mulwa, We Come in peace
 Kiswahili Youth: Patrick W. Kuloba, Mambo Kangaja
 English Children's: Kap Kirwok, I Blame the Sky
 Kiswahili Children's: Rebecca Nandwa, Nimefufuka

2015
 English Adult: Yvonne Adhiambo Owuor, Dust
 Kiswahili Adult: John Habwe, Pendo la karaha
 English Youth: Edward Mwangi, The Tissue Boy
 Kiswahili Youth: Ken Walibora, Nasikia Sauti ya mama
 English Children's: Stanley Gazemba, A Scare in the Village
 Kiswahili Children's: Clara Momanyi, Ushindi wa nakate

2017
 English Adult Category: Henry Ole Kulet, The Elephant Dance
 Kiswahili Adult Category: Tom Olali, Mashetani wa Alepo
 Kiswahili Youth Category: Mwenda Mbatiah, Majilio ya Mkombozi
 English Youth Category: Goro wa Kamau, Ghost and the Fortune Hunters
 English Children Category: Muthoni Muchemi, Koko Riko

2019
 English Adult Category: Mutu Wa Gethoi, Elders of the Mace
 Kiswahili Adult Category: Mwenda Mbatiah, Watoto Wa Mwelusi
 English Youth Category: Kinyanjui Kombani, Do or Do
 Kiswahili Youth Category: Hassan Ali, Picha Ya Karne
 English Children Category: Jennie Marima, Trio Troubles
 Kiswahili Children Category: Simiyu Mukuyuni, Busara Na Hekima
 Wahome Mutahi Literary Award: Kinyanjui Kombani, Of Pawns and Players

References

External links

 Kenya Publishers' Association official website
 Text Book Centre official website

Kenyan literary awards
Awards established in 1974
1974 establishments in Kenya
Fiction awards
Children's literary awards